Saperda cretata is a species of beetle in the family Cerambycidae. It was described by Newman in 1838. It is known from Canada and the United States.

References

cretata
Beetles described in 1838